Daryl Brook (born 19 November 1960) is a former professional footballer who played as a striker for Huddersfield Town, before becoming the coach of Emley.

Playing career

Huddersfield Town
Daryl Brook began his career at Huddersfield Town, along with his brother Nicky Brook, in the youth ranks and then they both turned professional at the beginning of the 1978–79 season and they both appeared on the team photo for that season. It was this season when Daryl made his debut, it was on the second to last game of the season against Hartlepool United. He was to play his second game in the next game at Bootham Crescent against York City but he broke his leg before the match took place and he never played for Huddersfield again. Brook remained at Leeds Road until 1980 when he moved to Emley.

Emley
Brook was to start an on-off 25-year relationship with the Welfare Ground outfit, serving as player, coach, physio and caretaker manager. His first spell lasted until 1984 when he transferred to Mossley.

Mossley
Daryl Brook was to only make 5 appearances for Mossley and he returned to Emley in the same year, 1984.

Emley, 2nd Spell
Brook was to remain a player until he became coach for the 1987–88 season. He had a testimonial year in 1999. He became physiotherapist at Emley in either the late 1990s or 2000s. He left the club, although remained supporter, in the 2000s. He returned in March 2008 to become caretaker manager along with Nicky Bramald following Ray Dennis's resignation. He remained joint- caretaker manager until the end of the season.

As of 2010, Brook is a builder in Shepley, Huddersfield and he has his own business, Daryl Brook Builders.

References

1960 births
Living people
People from Holmfirth
Sportspeople from Yorkshire
English footballers
Association football midfielders
Huddersfield Town A.F.C. players
Wakefield F.C. players
Mossley A.F.C. players
English Football League players